The fifth season of The Real Housewives of Dallas, an American reality television series, is broadcast on Bravo. It premiered on January 5, 2021, and is primarily filmed in Dallas, Texas. Its executive producers are Adam Karpel, Andrew Hoegl, John Paparazzo, Rich Bye, Samantha Billett and Andy Cohen.

The Real Housewives of Dallas focuses on the lives of Stephanie Hollman, Brandi Redmond, D'Andra Simmons, Kameron Westcott, Kary Brittingham and Tiffany Moon.

On August 17, 2021, Bravo announced that it had no plans to immediately renew the series for a sixth season.

Cast and synopsis 
All housewives from the previous season returned, with the exception of original cast member LeeAnne Locken.  The ladies are joined by physician Tiffany Moon  as well as friend Jennifer Davis Long. 

This season sees Brandi dealing with the consequences when a past video of her mocking the Asian community is leaked and how this impacts her relationship with new housewife Tiffany. Stephanie decides to pursue a new charitable career whilst Kameron continues to search for her ideal home. D'Andra and Kary butt heads as both feel the other is responsible for the breakdown of their friendship.

Episodes

References

The Real Housewives of Dallas
2021 American television seasons